Ashleigh Ann Buhai (née Simon, born 11 May 1989) is a South African professional golfer, who won the 2022 Women's Open, one of the major championships in women's golf.

Amateur career 
Buhai had a successful amateur career. She was the youngest player to win the ladies’ South African Amateur Stroke Play and Match Play double. She represented her country in the mainly professional Women's World Cup of Golf three times while still an amateur.

Professional career 
Buhai turned professional the day after her 18th birthday. She won the 2007 Catalonia Ladies Masters, which was her third event as a professional. She became the youngest ever professional winner on the Ladies European Tour (South Korea's Amy Yang won the 2006 ANZ Ladies Masters at a younger age as an amateur).

Ashleigh now plays under the name Ashleigh Buhai after marrying her husband, David, in December 2016.

Buhai earned her LPGA Tour card for 2014 at qualifying school.

On 7 August 2022, after 221 LPGA Tour starts, Buhai won her first major title by winning the AIG Women's Open at Muirfield, Scotland. She defeated Chun In-gee on the fourth hole of sudden-death playoff after both players finished regulation play at −10.

In December 2022, Buhai won the ISPS Handa Women's Australian Open by 1 stroke over Jiyai Shin.

Amateur wins
2004 Jack Newton Junior International Classic (Australia), South African Amateur Stroke Play, South African Amateur Match Play
2005 South African Amateur Stroke Play
2006 South African Amateur Stroke Play, South African Amateur Match Play, AJGA Rolex Tournament of Champions (USA)
2007 South African Amateur Stroke Play, South African Amateur Match Play

Professional wins (20)

LPGA Tour wins (1)

Co-sanctioned by the Ladies European Tour.

LPGA Tour playoff record (1–1)

Ladies European Tour wins (5)

 Co-sanctioned by the Sunshine Ladies Tour.
 Co-sanctioned by the LPGA Tour.

Ladies European Tour playoff record (1–0)

WPGA Tour of Australasia wins (1)
2022 ISPS Handa Women's Australian Open

Sunshine Ladies Tour wins (12)
2014 (3) Chase to Investec Cup Glendower, Ladies Tshwane Open, Chase to Investec Cup Blue Valley
2015 (1) Sunshine Ladies Tour Open
2017 (3) Cape Town Ladies Open, Sun International Ladies Challenge, Investec Royal Swazi (Ladies)
2018 (2) Joburg Ladies Open, Investec South African Women's Open
2019 (1) Canon Sunshine Ladies Tour Open
2020 (1) Jabra Ladies Classic
2023 (1) Investec South African Women's Open
Co-sanctioned by the Ladies European Tour.

Other wins (4)
2004 Acer South African Women's Open (as an amateur)
2005 Pam Golding Classic (Ladies Africa Tour) (as an amateur)
2006 Nedbank Masters (Ladies Africa Tour) (as an amateur)
2007 Acer South African Women's Open (as an amateur)

Major championships

Wins (1)

Results timeline
Results not in chronological order before 2019 or in 2020.

^ The Evian Championship was added as a major in 2013.

CUT = missed the half-way cut
NT = no tournament
T = tied

Summary

Most consecutive cuts made – 4 (2016 British – 2017 British)
Longest streak of top-10s – 1 (twice)

World ranking 
Position in Women's World Golf Rankings at the end of each calendar year.

^ as of 27 February 2023

Team appearances
Amateur
Espirito Santo Trophy (representing South Africa): 2004, 2006 (winners)

Professional
World Cup (representing South Africa): 2005, 2006, 2007, 2008

References

External links

South African female golfers
Ladies European Tour golfers
LPGA Tour golfers
Winners of LPGA major golf championships
Olympic golfers of South Africa
Golfers at the 2016 Summer Olympics
Golfers from Johannesburg
1989 births
Living people